George Arthur Rademacher (27 November 1889 – 26 September 1981) was an Australian rules footballer who played with South Melbourne in the Victorian Football League (VFL).

Family
The son of John Franz Ludwig Rademacher (1862-1945), and Annie Louisa Rademacher (-1932), née Price, George Arthur Rademacher was born in South Melbourne, Victoria on 27 November 1889. He married Annie Eva Battersby in 1918. He died in Ringwood, Victoria on 26 September 1981.

Football
Rademacher, originally from Leopold (a club based in South Melbourne). He played in the side which lost the 1914 Grand Final to Carlton. He was a half back flanker in South Melbourne's 1918 premiership team.

He played the first two games for South Melbourne in 1920, bringing his total to 100 games before accepting an offer from Hawthorn (in the VFA) to step in as coach after Neddy Alley stood down. He played one last game for South before being granted a clearance to be able to play for the club he now coached. He stayed on as captain-coach for the 1921 season before handing over the position to Bill Walton.

Rademacher continued to play with Hawthorn who were competing in the VFA but had retired before Hawthorn moved to the VFL.

He stayed at the club and performed various functions around the club for many years. In 1933 he stepped in again to coach Hawthorn, when appointed coach Fred Phillips died on the eve of the season opener. He coached for four games for the solitary win before the club appointed Bill Twomey to coach for the rest of the season.

Footnotes

References
Holmesby, Russell and Main, Jim (2007). The Encyclopedia of AFL Footballers. 7th ed. Melbourne: Bas Publishing.

External links
 
 Arthur Rademacher: Boyles Football Photos.
 Arthur Rademacher: The VFA Project.

1889 births
Australian rules footballers from Melbourne
Sydney Swans players
Sydney Swans Premiership players
Hawthorn Football Club coaches
Hawthorn Football Club (VFA) players
Hawthorn Football Club (VFA) coaches
Leopold Football Club (MJFA) players
1981 deaths
One-time VFL/AFL Premiership players
People from South Melbourne